Extreme Azerbaijan was the Azerbaijani version of the popular show Survivor, which was broadcast on Space TV starting on June 4, 2011. The show took place in the country of Namibia. Twelve celebrities took part in the competition. These twelve celebrities were divided into two teams of six called the blue and yellow teams. Filming for the show wrapped on June 7, 2011, after fourteen days of competition. The identity of the winner and how they may have won is not currently known, but what is known is that the contestants took part in such activities as mountain climbing, parachuting, scuba diving, and zorbing. The main host for the show was Emin Əhmədov (Emin Abbasov).

Finishing order

References

External links
 (Official Site) 
 (Contestants Profiles)
 (Photos of the Contestants)

Azerbaijan
2011 Azerbaijani television series debuts
2011 Azerbaijani television series endings
2010s Azerbaijani television series
Television shows filmed in Namibia